Márk Nikházi (born 2 February 1989 in Mosonmagyaróvár) is a Hungarian football player who currently plays for BFC Siófok.

Márk Nikházi was a member of the Hungary squad that reached the 2006 UEFA European Under-17 Football Championship finals in Luxembourg.

Career
On 1 February 2019, Nikházi joined III. Kerületi TVE.

Club statistics

Updated to games played as of 7 February 2022.

Honours
Diósgyőr
Hungarian League Cup (1): 2013–14

References

External links
 
 Hungarian Football Federation
 HLSZ
 

1989 births
Living people
People from Mosonmagyaróvár
Hungarian footballers
Hungary youth international footballers
Association football midfielders
MTK Budapest FC players
Diósgyőri VTK players
Dunaújváros PASE players
Paksi FC players
III. Kerületi TUE footballers
BFC Siófok players
Nemzeti Bajnokság I players
Sportspeople from Győr-Moson-Sopron County